Monsanto is a village in the civil parish of Monsanto e Idanha-a-Velha, in the municipality of Idanha-a-Nova, District of Castelo Branco, Portugal. In 2011, it covered an area of 131.76 km² and had 828 inhabitants (June 30, 2011). Monsanto would become popularly known as "the most Portuguese village of Portugal" due to a government-sponsored competition that awarded twelve historic villages the distinction of Most Portuguese Village of their own province in 1938.

History

It was the main town of the concelho between 1174 and the beginning of the 19th century, and the county seat in the period of 1758-1853. The mountain Monsanto rises abruptly to the East of the Idanha-a-Nova up to 758 meters above sea level. The earliest traces of man is from Early Stone Age at the time of the ice-ages. Later, Romans settled at the base of the mountain. Also traces from Visigothic in the early Middle Ages and even earlier Arab presence have been found in the area. In the 12th century, King Afonso I of Portugal conquered Monsanto from the Moors as part of the Christian Reconquista. In 1165, he granted the custody of the city to a knights' order of the church, first to the Order of Knights Templar, and later to the Order of Santiago. The city was given to the military orders to maintain the reconquered city with Christian hands, and Grand Master the Order of Knights Templar, Gualdim Pais, was manager of the building of the fortress. Later, King Sancho I of Portugal reconstructed and repopulated it after the wars with the Leonese. Unfortunately, the medieval castle was destroyed in the nineteenth century because of an explosion in the ammunition depot of the castle. Monsanto would become popularly known as "the most Portuguese village of Portugal" due to a government-sponsored competition that awarded Monsanto this distinction in 1938. The title was awarded by the Portuguese Secretariat for Propaganda under the Estado Novo regime. A symbol of Portugal, the Silver Rooster (Galo de Prata), designed by Abel Pereira da Silva, was the coveted trophy in this competition and can be seen atop the Clock Tower or Lucano Tower of Monsanto. In 2013, the parish merged into the new parish Monsanto e Idanha-a-Velha.

Geography
In 2011, it covered an area of 131.76 km² and had 828 inhabitants (June 30, 2011). The mountain rock is granite, which also the historic and present village is built upon in a fusion of nature and its landforms. This fusion can be seen in the uses of caves and rocks being converted into construction parts.

Places

 Castle of Monsanto
 Chapel of Saint Peter de Vir à Corça o Chapel of Saint Peter de Vira-Corça
 Roman archaeological site of Saint Lawrence
 Old village of Monsanto
 Pillory of Monsanto
 Tower of Lucano
 Chapel of Our Lady of Azenha
 Chapel of Our Lady of the Foot of the Cross
 Chapel of Saint Mary of the Castle
 Chapel of Saint Anthony
 Chapel of Saint Joseph
 Chapel of Saint Michael of the Castle
 Chapel of Saint Sebastian
 Chapel of the Holy Spirit
 Ferreiro Fountain
 Church of Mercy of Monsanto
 Parish Church of Monsanto or Church of the Saint Savior
 Solar of the Marquis of Graciosa Family (Posto de Turismo do Monsanto)
 Solar of Melo Family or Solar of the Counts of Monsanto
 Solar of Pinheiro Family or Solar of the Mono Fountain
 Solar of the Priors of Monsanto

References

External links

The Monsanto's freguesia
Radio Clube of Monsanto
History of Portugal at Wikipedia History of Portugal

Idanha-a-Nova